Matthew Earl Beesley is an American film director and television director living in Bell Canyon, California; he is the son of Dr. Earl Beesley.

From 1984 to 1988, he worked as assistant director on a number of notable films including National Lampoon's Christmas Vacation (1989), The Beverly Hillbillies (1993) and Chain Reaction (1996). He made his head directorial debut with the 1998  film Point Blank starring Mickey Rourke.

Some of his television directing credits include CSI: Crime Scene Investigation, CSI: Miami, Prison Break, Lost, Law & Order: Special Victims Unit, Criminal Minds, The Closer and Hawaii Five-0.

References

External links

American television directors
Television producers from California
Living people
Place of birth missing (living people)
Year of birth missing (living people)
People from Bell Canyon, California
Film directors from California